Evil Machines is a 2011 book of fantasy stories written by Monty Python's Terry Jones.  The book has a cover design and illustrations by Ryan Gillard and Keira Kinsella.

Contents 

The book contains thirteen short stories linked by a common theme which emerges part way through the series.  The concept for the stories came to Jones in a car - "I was actually driving across London and I think I got held up by a red traffic light and suddenly the phrase, "Evil machines", drifted across my mind and I thought "Well that's a good title and I could use that",  so I went home and started writing the stories."

The stories became the libretto for an opera staged in Lisbon in 2008 and Jones always intended to re-write them.  However other events intervened and he left them as-was until a conversation with Justin Pollard of Unbound prompted their publication several years after they were first written.

The story listing is as follows:

 The Truthful Phone
 The Nice Bomb
 The Lift That Took People to Places They Didn't Want to Go
 Motorbike Thieves
 The Kidnap Car
 The Vacuum Cleaner That Was Too Powerful
 The Train to Anywhere
 The Rocket to Hell
 The Dog Maker and Other Wonders
 The Day Things Started to Go Wrong
 The Castle of Imagination
 The End of Life
 The Love Machine

The launch took place on Friday 4 November 2011 at the Adam Street Club, London, UK. At the launch Jones indicated that "The Nice Bomb" and "The Lift That Took People to Places They Didn't Want to Go" were probably the two stories of which he was most fond.

The stories generally feature a sting in the tail, with, for example, the UK City of Swindon being lampooned in "The Lift That Took People to Places They Didn't Want to Go".

References

2011 children's books
Children's short story collections
British short story collections
Books by Terry Jones
2011 short story collections